3-Methylfuran is an organic compound with the formula C5H6O. It is formed from the gas-phase reaction of hydroxyl radical with isoprene.

In mice, it is toxic by inhalation.

See also
2-Methylfuran

References

3-Furyl compounds